Albert "Jupp" Gardiner (30 July 1867 – 14 August 1952) was an Australian politician who served as a Senator for New South Wales from 1910 to 1926 and again briefly in 1928. A member of the Labor Party, he served in cabinet as Vice-President of the Executive Council under Andrew Fisher and Billy Hughes, and from 1916 to 1926 was his party's Senate leader; he was its only senator from 1920 to 1922. Before entering federal politics he had served in the Parliament of New South Wales from 1891 to 1895 and from 1904 to 1907.

Early life
Gardiner was born in Orange, New South Wales, one of twelve children born to Charlotte (née Davis) and William Gardiner. His father was born in Tasmania and worked as a wheelwright; his mother was illiterate. Gardiner was educated at Flanagan's School in Orange until the age of 15, when he was apprenticed to a carpenter. He moved to Parkes in 1890 and began working at the Hazlehurst gold battery. He was nicknamed "Jupp" after the English cricketer Harry Jupp, who he was supposed to resemble.

New South Wales politics
In 1891, Gardiner was elected to the New South Wales Legislative Assembly with the support of the Labor Electoral League, the Labor Party's predecessor. He topped the poll in the seat of Forbes, although he refused to sign Labor's solidarity pledge in 1893.  In 1894, with the abolition of Forbes, he was elected the member for Ashburnham, but was defeated in 1895.  He stood unsuccessfully for Ashburnham in 1898 for the Free Trade Party and Orange in 1901 as an independent.  In 1897, he divorced his first wife Ada Evelyn Jewell, who he had married in 1892, and he married Theresa Alice Clayton in 1902.  He was elected member for Orange in 1904, but lost the seat in 1907.

Federal politics
From 1910 to 1926, Gardiner was a Senator for New South Wales in Federal Parliament.  He was appointed Vice-President of the Executive Council in 1914 and Assistant Minister for Defence in 1915.  He resigned from the ministry in opposition to conscription before the first plebiscite on conscription in October 1916.  After the Labor split over the issue, he became Labor leader in the Senate and the only Labor Senator from 1920 to 1922.  A filibuster in 1918 delivered Federal Parliament's longest speech at 12 hours and 40 minutes (the combined Parnell-Bressington filibuster in the South Australian upper house went for over 13 hours); this forced the introduction of a time limit on future speeches. In 1926, he lost his Senate seat, but he filled a casual vacancy for five months in 1928, despite expulsion from the Lang-led state branch of the party.  He unsuccessfully contested Dalley as an independent Labor candidate in 1928.  He then unsuccessfully contested the State seats of Waverley in 1932 and Canterbury in 1935 as an Official Labor candidate—that is, recognised by the Federal Labor Party, but not the State branch.

In 1922, Gardiner contested the leadership of the Labor Party against Matthew Charlton who defeated him by 22 votes to 2.

He played rugby union as a forward and represented New South Wales against New Zealand and Queensland in 1897 and against England in 1899.

Gardiner died at Bondi Junction, survived by his wife, a son and a daughter.

References

Members of the New South Wales Legislative Assembly
Australian Labor Party members of the Parliament of Australia
1867 births
1952 deaths
Members of the Australian Senate for New South Wales
Australian sportsperson-politicians
20th-century Australian politicians